Trunki is a brand of ride-on/carry-on hand luggage for children, designed by Rob Law. The product became well-known after featuring on the UK television series Dragons' Den in 2006.

Trunki has won more than a hundred product and design awards, including several from Design Week, Progressive Preschool, Mother and Baby Magazine, D & AD, children's retailer Right Start, Practical Parenting magazine and the Nick Jr. television channel.

History
Magmatic, the company that manufactures the Trunki range, was formed on 5 May 2006.

Inventor Rob Law MBE came to public attention in 2006 following an appearance on BBC2's Dragons' Den programme in which panellist, Theo Paphitis, tugged and broke the strap of a sample Trunki.  Dragon Richard Farleigh then expressed interest in £100,000 for 50% of the company, a suggestion which Law rejected.

In 2016 Trunki celebrated its 10th anniversary - Magmatic has sold more than 3,000,000 Trunki suitcases, in over 100 countries worldwide, through retailers including John Lewis, Argos, Harrods, Tesco and Next since May 2006.More than 500 articles have appeared about the Trunki in the British media and several television programmes have since featured Rob Law, including Working Lunch, Beat the Boss, This Morning and GMTV. In June 2011 the Trunki BoostApak was featured on BBC 1's The Apprentice. It was taken to France for contestants to see and broke the record for boardroom orders with an order of €214,000. Following this, sales of the Trunki BoostApak quadrupled.

On 30 August 2008, Duncan Bannatyne, a panelist on Dragon's Den, appeared on ITV's Who Wants to Be a Millionaire? and when asked by presenter Chris Tarrant "Is there a sort of classic of one you've missed?" replied, "There is one, a little suitcase on wheels... every time I go to an airport I see one or two of these of these... it's the only one we missed out on I think."

Made In The UK
On 5 May 2012, the company's sixth anniversary, Magmatic expanded their production into the UK. The first Trunki to roll off the UK production line was the Team GB Trunki, and the company claimed that by the end of 2012 all Trunki suitcases sold in the UK will have been made there too. All UK made cases will be stamped "Made in England".

The design of the Trunki is registered as a Community Design. On 3 November 2015, the United Kingdom Supreme Court started to hear a case over the extent of legal protection of the Trunki design. PMS International, a Hong Kong firm, produce a similar range of products branded Kiddee Cases. Magmatic won the case in the High Court – the lowest civil court in England and Wales –  in 2013, but it was overturned on appeal in 2014. The issue to be decided is "What significance attaches to the fact that a graphical representation of a Community registered design shows no surface decoration?"

Product Range
Since launching their ride-on suitcase in 2006, Magmatic have expanded their product offering to include the following ranges:

Editions

Sources

References

External links
 Official website

Goods manufactured in England
Luggage brands